Georgios Christodoulou (born August 22, 1965) is a former international Cypriot football defender.

He played for Omonia, Olympiacos and APOEL.

External links
 

1965 births
Living people
Super League Greece players
APOEL FC players
AC Omonia players
Olympiacos F.C. players
Cypriot footballers
Cyprus international footballers
Greek Cypriot people
Association football defenders
Sportspeople from Nicosia